Esther Akinsulie (born 22 April 1984 in Winnipeg, Manitoba) is a Canadian athlete specializing in the 400-metre sprint.  She graduated from Carleton University with a degree in psychology.

Biography

Esther Akinsulie began competing in track in her final year at A.Y. Jackson Secondary School, prior to which her focus had been basketball.  During her first year at Carleton University she realized she couldn't continue competitively in both sports and chose track as she felt she would have a longer career as a runner.

Esther Akinsulie won two medals at the 2009 Universiade held in Belgrade: the silver in the 400-metre sprint, with 51.70 seconds, and gold in the 4 × 400-metre relay alongside Carline Muir, Amonn Nelson and Kimberly Hyacinthe.

At the 2009 Francophonie Games in Lebanon, Akinsulie won bronze in the 200-metre sprint, silver in the 4 × 400-metre relay alongside Tasha Monroe, Lauren Seibel and Melina Thibodeau, and gold in the 4 × 100-metre relay alongside Hyacinthe, Jennifer Cotten and Kate Ruediger.

Her 2010 season was tarnished by an Achilles tendon injury. She returned to competition in 2011 at the Canadian Track and Field Championships, winning silver in the 400-metre sprint and bronze in the 200-metre sprint.

She competed in the 2009 and 2011 World Championships at the 4 × 400-metre event, but the Canadian relay was eliminated each time in the playoffs.

In February 2013 Akinsulie had a positive anti-doping test on a diuretic and was suspended for six months. She satisfied officials that the substance was not for performance-enhancing reasons.

Awards

Records

References

1984 births
Living people
Canadian female track and field athletes
Carleton University alumni
Athletes from Winnipeg
Universiade medalists in athletics (track and field)
Universiade gold medalists for Canada
Universiade silver medalists for Canada
Medalists at the 2009 Summer Universiade
Athletes (track and field) at the 2007 Pan American Games
Pan American Games track and field athletes for Canada
21st-century Canadian women